Berezan may refer to:

 Berezan, Kyiv Oblast, a city in Ukraine
 Berezan Island, an island in the Black Sea
 Berezan' Runestone, discovered in 1905
 Berezan Estuary, open estuary on the northern coast of the Black Sea

People
 Jennifer Berezan (born 1961), Canadian singer-songwriter, producer, and activist
 Perry Berezan (born 1964), Canadian ice hockey centre